Homero Ernesto Calderón Gazui (born 20 October 1993), simply known as Homero Calderón is a Venezuelan professional former soccer player who plays for Aragua F.C. on loan from ACD Lara as a midfielder.

Club career
Born in Valencia, Calderón kicked off his career with Atlético Venezuela where he made 26 appearances between 2012 and 2014 without scoring a goal. On 28 May 2014, he signed for Doxa Katokopias in Cypriot First Division.

References

External links
Homero Calderón at Soccerway

1993 births
Living people
Association football forwards
Venezuelan footballers
Venezuelan expatriate footballers
Atlético Venezuela C.F. players
Doxa Katokopias FC players
Asociación Civil Deportivo Lara players
F.C. Vizela players
Merelinense F.C. players
G.D. Gafanha players
Sertanense F.C. players
Aragua FC players
Venezuelan Primera División players
Liga Portugal 2 players
Cypriot First Division players
Expatriate footballers in Cyprus
Expatriate footballers in Portugal
Venezuelan expatriate sportspeople in Portugal
Venezuelan expatriate sportspeople in Cyprus
Sportspeople from Valencia, Venezuela